"Headstrong" is the debut single of American rock band Trapt from their 2002 self-titled debut album. It reached  1 on the US Billboard Mainstream Rock and Modern Rock Tracks charts and No. 16 on the Billboard Hot 100. It crossed over to mainstream pop radio, peaking at No. 4 on the Billboard Mainstream Top 40. The song also won two Billboard Music Awards in 2003 for "Best Modern Rock Track" and "Best Rock Track".

Billboard rated "Headstrong" the No. 1 modern rock and mainstream rock song of 2003. In 2018, an official poll by Ultimate Guitar saw the site's users rate "Headstrong" as having the fourth worst riff of all time.

Music video
A music video was produced for "Headstrong" which shows the band performing in front of a crowd. Paper and other debris are seen flying past in furious winds as the group plays in an urban nighttime setting, as well as a couple of teenagers arguing with the people they know, such as one teen getting into an argument with his father while they are in a car and the kid becomes fed up with his father's attitude and storms off as well as another teen quitting his job at a restaurant after getting pushed around by his boss; the two teens then join Trapt in the crowd. A third teen is seen walking through the crowd and eventually graffitis Trapt's logo on a wall. The video found considerable airplay on MTV2 and MMUSA upon release. The video was directed by Brian Scott Weber.

Track listings and formats
 US 7-inch vinyl
 "Headstrong"  – 4:45
 "Still Frame"  – 4:31

 Australian CD single
 "Headstrong"  – 4:45
 "Promise"  – 3:36
 "Hollowman"  – 5:03

Charts

Weekly charts

Year-end charts

Decade-end charts

Certifications

Release history

References

2002 debut singles
2002 songs
American alternative rock songs
Song recordings produced by Garth Richardson
Trapt songs
Warner Records singles